Bill Tilden defeated Bill Johnston in the final, 6–1, 1–6, 7–5, 5–7, 6–3 to win the men's singles tennis title at the 1920 U.S. National Championships. It was Tilden's first U.S. Championships singles title, the first of an eventual record seven such titles, and his second major singles title overall.

Draw

Final eight

Earlier rounds

References

Men's singles
1920